The G. Heileman Brewing Company of La Crosse, Wisconsin, United States, was a brewery firm that operated from 1858 to 1996.  It was ultimately acquired by Stroh's.  From 1872 until its acquisition, the brewery bore the family name of its co-founder and brewer Gottlieb Heileman.

Background

In 1858, Gottlieb Heileman, an immigrant from Württemberg, joined in a business venture with John Gund, an immigrant from Baden. Together, the pair founded The City Brewery in La Crosse, Wisconsin in 1858. The City Brewery produced beer at a modest rate, sticking to just local and regional production. The beer produced at the City Brewery primarily went to local hotels and bars. Because hotels and bars were their primary target, Heileman and Gund collaborated on the International Hotel, formerly the Augusta Hotel, which the pair bought and rebuilt after a fire in 1862. 

In 1872, however, the pair had a falling out due to several factors, foremost among them being Gund's desire to expand the brewery and Heileman's desire to stay local. Following the dissolution of the partnership, Gund bought Heileman's shares of the International Hotel and Heileman bought Gund's shares of the City Brewery. Gund went on to found the Gund Brewing Company whereas Heileman renamed the City Brewery the G. Heileman's City Brewery.

History

1872–1920

The G. Heileman Brewery came to exist after the dissolution of the Gund/Heileman partnership in 1872. Still under Heileman's direction, the company remained a local brewery, producing only 3,000 barrels of beer a year for La Crosse and the surrounding community. 

In 1878, Heileman died. Because the company was family held, following Heileman's death, ownership passed on to his widow, Johanna Heileman, who was to control the company until their nine-year-old son, Henry, was ready to take over. With her brother-in-law as foreman in the brewery, the Heileman Brewery finally started expanding. By 1880 they were producing more than 7,000 barrels of beer. Eventually, Johanna's son-in-law, Emil T. Mueller, joined the family business. The three of them incorporated the company in 1890, calling it the G. Heileman Brewing Company – the name it held until its closing in 1991.

Following the death of Henry Heileman, the heir to the company, in 1895, Mueller became vice president of the company, behind only Johanna, one of the first female CEO's in the history of the United States. It was also around the time of Henry's death that Heileman began developing their historic Old Style Brand. By 1902, the company was producing around 160,000 barrels of Old Style Lager. It was also that year that the company voted in a union, the last brewer in La Crosse to do so, allowing the company to expand even further. By 1915, Heileman had expanded to serving over 30 states. Johanna died in 1917, shortly after reaching 34 distribution states and only three years before Prohibition began in 1920.

1920–1933
Prohibition was signed into law officially on January 17, 1920, making it illegal to produce any beverage with more than half a percent of alcohol. Heileman quickly reorganized, dropping their Old Style Lager in favor of a new product, New Style Lager, which contained less than ½ a percent of alcohol. Heileman also began producing soda beverages and "malt tonics" with very little success – the company only sold 20,000 barrels in 1926. The company finally hit success with their production of barley malt syrup, legally sold as a sweetener but which they made with the intention of consumers using it in private beer-making.

Thus, Heileman barely made it through Prohibition. Gund Brewery, founded after the Heileman/Gund partnership broke up, was unable to stay afloat during this time. A fire in September 1931 almost ran Heileman out of business, causing upwards of $50,000 in damages. The company continued to squeak by until President Franklin D. Roosevelt's Congress modified the meaning of the 18th Amendment by removing beer and light wines from the Federal Government's definition of 
"alcoholic beverages", after which Heileman resumed all beer-making operations.

1933–1987
Following the end of Prohibition, the Heileman family members sold their shares of the company to Paul Davis Company of Chicago in 1933, who formalized the company as The G. Heileman Brewing Company Incorporated; the new company president signed the very first stocks of Heileman that same year. Throughout the 1930s, the company continued to expand their facilities to accommodate increased production needs. There was a major upgrade in the mid 1930s following the creation of Special Export, Heileman's second house brew. Whereas Old Style Lager was only around 4% alcohol, Special Export was over 6%.

There was a brief slowing in production during World War II, when the company was impacted by the rationing going on in the country. It was also during WWII that the company took a different approach to brewing and marketing. Heileman began producing several new labels, none of which were as well done as their previous two labels, Old Style Lager and Special Export. Previously, marketing campaigns stressed the quality of their products, but with the influx of labels, Heileman began focusing on the prices and consumer appeal. The focus away from quality led to a sharp decrease in sales by the end of WWII. Not only did marketing change, but a strike at the La Crosse Brewery in 1948 shut down operations down for three months.

Roy E. Kumm took over as president in 1957. A long-time employee at Heileman, Kumm remembered Heileman's prior to World War II and wanted to return the company to that position. He developed the strategy that Heileman would follow for the next three decades:

 Expand to new markets
 Increase capacity
 Offer vastly different brands to appeal to a wide range of people.

While a fire in 1959 caused over $100,000 in damages, and almost derailed Kumm's efforts, the company stayed on track. They continued to expand under Kumm by purchasing new breweries and labels. Kumm also introduced  a German-style beer festival modeled on the Oktoberfest in Munich, and beer by that name to the La Crosse region to increase the sales of Heileman beers. The La Crosse, Wisconsin, Oktoberfest USA celebration was trademarked with the federal government that same year. Between the end of WWII and 1971, Heileman had jumped from 39th in the brewing industry to 15th.

It was also in the 1960s that Heileman hired Russell G. Cleary, Kumm's son-in-law. Following Kumm's death from stomach cancer in 1971, Cleary took over as president. Building on a strategy begun by his predecessors, Cleary accelerated an acquisition and consolidation effort in the 1970s and early 1980s. Through his efforts, Cleary was able to get Heileman stock traded at the New York Stock Exchange on May 23, 1973. During this period, the company owned several breweries in other states. Historic U.S. brewing names that were consolidated into G. Heileman during its final years include Black Label, Blatz, Blitz-Weinhard, Drewry's, Falls City, Grain Belt, Gluek Brewing, National Bohemian, Olympia, Rainier, Christian Schmidt, Jacob Schmidt, and Wiedemann.

Several of the acquisitions were met with legal issues regarding the Sherman Antitrust Act, limiting monopolization of markets, despite a majority of industry analysts calling that many of Heileman's proposed acquisitions would only intensify, not monopolize, the industry. With such hostility towards Heileman when they tried buying other breweries, the company began expanding into different industries such as baking, snack foods, and mineral water, including a Heileman original, La Croix. The brewing capabilities of Heileman, combined with their supplemental industries, peaked at fourth place in 1983, behind Anheuser-Busch, Miller, and Stroh Brewery Company. The company at the time was making over 17 million barrels per year, with annual sales of $1.3 billion.

Despite being in the top five in the industry, Heileman's sales went unchanged throughout the mid 1980s, attributed to brutal marketing strategies within the brewing industry and the overall decrease in the sale of beer throughout the 1980s. In 1987, Alan Bond of Australia made moves to take over the company and despite Heileman's best efforts in preventing the takeover, Bond acquired the company in a leveraged buyout, with Cleary able only to negotiate the "best possible deal for employees, stockholders, and the city of La Crosse".

1987–1996

Bond, who already controlled the Tooheys name and almost 50% of the brewing industry in Australia, hoped to build a worldwide brewing combine. Lacking cash, he financed the acquisition of G. Heileman with junk bonds. The collapse of Bond's financial empire led indirectly to the end of Heileman's existence as an independent brewer. Cleary stayed on as director for an additional two years before finally retiring from the company in 1989. As a direct result of the Alan Bond collapse, the G. Heileman Brewing Company declared bankruptcy in January 1991.  The troubled firm sought salvation with an aggressive push into the malt liquor market.

In a controversial move, company leadership developed a new brand of malt liquor to be named Power Master.  "Power Master" brand of malt liquor was brewed with an alcohol by volume of 7.4%, significantly higher than existing malt liquor brands. Protestors cited Heileman's distribution and advertising strategies as evidence that the company was targeting the high-alcohol beverage toward urban African-Americans, especially in Chicago, one of Heileman's core markets.  Fr. Michael Pfleger took a leading role in opposing Power Master, helping to organize a threatened boycott of one of Heileman's established malt liquor brands, Colt 45, which, at the time, had an alcohol percentage of 5.6%.  The Colt 45 boycott was called off when the Bureau of Alcohol, Tobacco, Firearms, and Explosives succeeded, in July 1991, in persuading Heileman to pull the "Power Master" brand from the market.

The private equity firm Hicks, Muse bought G. Heileman in 1994, and sold the company to competitor Stroh Brewery Company two years later. The Detroit-based company purchased G. Heileman for $300 million and assumed its outstanding debt. G. Heileman's brewery names and intellectual properties became part of the Pabst Brewing Company, the current owner, when Stroh was split between Pabst and the Miller Brewing Company. Pabst oversees the brewing of several well-known Heileman brands, including Old Style and Special Export, under the G. Heileman name.

Breweries
Throughout Kumm and Cleary's tenures as company president and CEO, they went on a campaign of acquisition and consolidations, resulting in Heileman's purchase of 16 breweries through the 1960s, 1970s, and 1980s. Five of those breweries came with the purchase of the Carling Brewery plants and labels. However, the most breweries under the House of Heileman umbrella at any one time was thirteen (for a brief period in 1983).

Brands
Over the course of Heileman's history, and especially during Kumm and Cleary's times at the company, there was quite a bit of brand acquisition, totaling around 400 individual labels, falling under over 50 different brands.

Below is a table of selected brands.

Old Style

Old Style was the first brand created by Heileman. Heileman purchased the trademarks for Golden Leaf in 1899, and to complement their lighter beer, the company created The Old Times Lager in 1900. Old Times Lager was changed to Old Style Lager after a lawsuit in 1902, and remained Old Style for the remainder of the brand's life. The company bought the rights to the Old Style label and a Grenadier holding a stein, for their advertisements, in 1905. Despite the trademark of the brand, several competitors created beers with similar sounding names, prompting Heileman to add a red triangle to their advertisements in 1914, indicating that anything without the red triangle is not genuine Old Style brand.

Heileman had to discontinue Old Style Lager during Prohibition, opting for a new brand, New Style Lager, which they sold as a near-beer (beer that contains less than 0.5% alcohol). New Style, along with the malt syrups Heileman sold, got the company through Prohibition and Old Style Lager returned.

The company continued with the Old Style Lager name for the next decade, changing the name of the brand in 1957 when Kumm became president. Instead of being called Old Style Lager, it was re-branded to be just Old Style. Throughout Kumm and his predecessor's terms as president, the brand was popular throughout Wisconsin, the Chicago metro area, Minnesota, Iowa, Nebraska, Michigan, and North Dakota. The brand was so popular in the Chicago area that it became one of the sponsors for the Chicago Cubs.

Old Style debuted as the #71 beer on the list of top 100 beers by the Cold Cans podcast.

King Gambrinus
King Gambrinus is a legendary Germanic king and is regarded today as the Patron Saint and sometimes regarded as the guardian of beer and brewing, making him a prominent figure in the brewing industry. Heileman is one of the many breweries throughout the world that uses King Gambrinus as their mascot. Pabst Brewing Company is another American brewer to use Gambrinus as their mascot.

Heileman's history with King Gambrinus goes back to 1939 when the company purchased a 15-foot, 2,000 pound statue of King Gambrinus from a failing brewery in New Orleans for $100. The statue was placed outside the brewery and remains there even today. The company commissioned a second King Gambrinus statue in the late 1970s, when they contracted Elmer Petersen, a local artist, to create an eight-foot bronze statue. The second statue was finished and installed in front of the G. Heileman Corporate Headquarters in La Crosse, WI in 1980. It was named "King Gambrinus: Patron Saint and Guardian of Beer", and nicknamed "Gammy" by the Heileman employees to avoid confusion with the King Gambrinus statue outside the brewery.

The original statue was vandalized in early 2015, so the City Brewery replaced the entire statue by September 2016 with an exact replica. "Gammy" was put in storage after some weather related damage, but is in the process of being re-bronzed to make it more durable.

Today

As of 2021, the former Heileman's flagship brewery in La Crosse is owned and operated by the City Brewing Company. The brewery chose to use the name that the former Heileman's used as its startup name in 1858–1872. City Brewing brews beer and packages bottled tea, soft drinks, and energy drinks. It does not have ownership rights over the intellectual property, including beer brand names, associated with the G. Heileman Brewing Company, however, it is the sole producer of Old Style and has two of their own labels, La Crosse Lager and Kul Light.

World's Largest Six Pack
In 1969, designer Roy Wilson and the G. Heileman Brewing Company constructed a set of metal tanks, holding a total of 22,220 barrels of beer, adjacent to their La Crosse brewery. The tanks were used for inventory storage and were painted in the colors of a six-pack of Old Style. For publicity purposes, the brewery called the tanks the "World's Largest Six-Pack". The tanks continued in use as of 2021 by City Brewing, although the Old Style logo had been painted over and replaced by vinyl plastic sheaths printed with the colors and packaging style of City's La Crosse Lager.

See also
 Beer in Milwaukee
 List of defunct breweries in the United States

Notes

External links
 Return of the World's Largest Six Pack

1858 establishments in Wisconsin
1996 disestablishments in Wisconsin
American companies established in 1858
Food and drink companies disestablished in 1996
Food and drink companies established in 1858
Beer brewing companies based in Wisconsin
Defunct brewery companies of the United States
History of Wisconsin
La Crosse, Wisconsin
Pabst Brewing Company